Jaka Primožič (born 8 December 1998 in Škofja Loka) is a Slovenian racing cyclist, who currently rides for UCI Continental team .

Major results

2015
 1st Overall Olympic Hopes - Belgrade Trophy Milan Panić
1st Stage 1
 2nd Time trial, National Junior Road Championships
2016
 1st Overall Olympic Hopes - Belgrade Trophy Milan Panić
1st Stages 1 & 2
 1st Overall Oberösterreich Juniorenrundfahrt
1st Stage 3
 2nd Montichiari–Roncone
 3rd Time trial, National Junior Road Championships
 3rd Overall Course de la Paix Juniors
 4th Gent–Wevelgem Juniors
 5th Overall Giro della Lunigiana
 5th Trofeo Citta di Loano
 7th Overall GP Général Patton
 UCI Junior Road World Championships
8th Road race
9th Time trial
 9th Trofeo Guido Dorigo
2017
 6th Belgrade–Banja Luka I
2018
 4th GP Laguna
 10th Time trial, Mediterranean Games
2019
 1st Young rider classification, Oberösterreichrundfahrt
 5th Overall Carpathian Couriers Race
 5th GP Adria Mobil
 5th GP Slovenian Istria
 5th Gemenc Grand Prix II
 8th Gemenc Grand Prix I
2021
 8th Overall Istrian Spring Trophy
2022
 4th Road race, National Road Championships
 9th Overall Istrian Spring Trophy
 9th Overall Giro della Friuli Venezia Giulia

References

External links

1998 births
Living people
Slovenian male cyclists
People from Škofja Loka
Competitors at the 2018 Mediterranean Games
Mediterranean Games competitors for Slovenia
Cyclists at the 2019 European Games
European Games competitors for Slovenia